Amettes is a commune in the Pas-de-Calais department in the Hauts-de-France region of France.

Geography

Population

Sights
 The church of St. Sulpice, dating from the sixteenth century.
 The war memorial.

Personalities
Benedict Joseph Labre, Catholic saint, was born here in 1748.

See also
Communes of the Pas-de-Calais department

References

External links

 The war memorial at Amettes 

Communes of Pas-de-Calais